The Yariguies brush finch (Atlapetes latinuchus yariguierum) is a subspecies of the yellow-breasted brush finch, discovered in 2004 in Colombia.

Description
The feathers of the breast, abdomen, and throat are yellow; those of the coverts, primaries, secondaries, scapulars, auriculars, lores, and tail are black; the crown feathers are russet. It is unique among its conspecifics because it has a jet black back, wing and tail.

Distribution and habitat
Its habitat is the remote cloud rainforest in the northern Colombia. The pristine area where the birds live is one of the last remaining such Andean cloud forests in the country. The government has established a 190,000 ha park in the region (Donegan & Huertas 2005; Huertas & Donegan 2006).  The discovery was made by Thomas Donegan, of Fundación ProAves and Blanca Huertas, of the Natural History Museum and University College London, together with Elkin Briceno of CDMB. The research team had studied the isolated and densely vegetated region in various expeditions over a period of three years. Some regions had to be reached by all day hikes or helicopter drop.

Species discovery
The bird has been discovered in the remote Yariguies mountains in an expedition co-led by Thomas Donegan of Fundación ProAves and Blanca Huertas, a curator at the Natural History Museum in London.  According to the researchers, the region was so little explored that several more hitherto undescribed birds and butterflies are found there (Donegan & Huertas, 2006).  Huertas, a lepidopterologist by training, found several taxa of butterflies new to science (Huertas & Arias 2007).  Further information about the biological exploration of the region is found in expedition reports (Donegan & Huertas 2005; Huertas & Donegan 2006). The vernacular name "Yariguies brush finch" was selected because the yellow-breasted brush finch, as a subspecies of which it is currently classified, is to be split into several species, and it is not clear at the moment to which of these the newly described bird would belong (Donegan & Huertas, 2006).

Etymology
The bird is named after the Yariguies indigenous tribe who give their name to the mountain range where the bird was found. Serranía de los Yariguíes was declared a national park last year by the Colombian government and a large forest nature reserve was recently established in the region by Fundación ProAves, Colombia's bird conservation NGO.

References
Anonymous, (2006): New Bird Discovered on Unexplored Colombian Mountain by BP Conservation Programme Project. BP Conservation Programme Newsletter 2006(27): 2–3. PDF fulltext
Donegan, Thomas & Avendano, Jorge E. (2008): Notes on Tapaculos (Passeriformes: Rhinocryptidae) of the Eastern Andes of Colombia and Venezuelan Andes, with a new subspecies of Scytalopus griseicollis from Colombia. Ornitologia Colombiana 6. 24-65 PDF fulltext
Donegan, Thomas M. & Huertas, Blanca (2006): A new brush-finch in the Atlapetes latinuchus complex from the Yariguíes Mountains and adjacent Eastern Andes of Colombia. Bulletin of the British Ornithologists' Club 126(2): 94-116. PDF fulltext
Donegan, Thomas M. & Huertas, Blanca (2005): Threatened Species of Serranía de los Yariguíes: Final Report. Published online by Fundación ProAves, Colombia. Colombian EBA Project Report Series 5. PDF fulltext
Huertas, Blanca & Donegan, Thomas M. (2006): Proyecto YARÉ: Investigación y Evaluación de las Especies Amenazadas de la Serranía de los Yariguíes, Santander, Colombia. BP Conservation Programme. Informe Final. Published online by Fundación ProAves, Colombia. Colombian EBA Project Report Series 7. PDF fulltext
Huertas, Blanca & Arias, J. J. (2007): A new butterfly species from the Colombian Andes and a review of the taxonomy of the genera Idioneurula Strand, 1932 and Tamania Pyrcz, 1995. Zootaxa 1652. 27-40 PDF fulltext

Footnotes

External links
"Groups find colorful bird in Colombia" Associated Press, Lauren Dake, October 9, 2006

Yariguies brush finch
Birds of the Colombian Andes
Yariguies brush finch